The 2018 Myanmar National League, also known as the 2018 MPT Myanmar National League, is the 9th season of the Myanmar National League, the top Burmese professional league for association football clubs since its founding in 2009. The departure of the two clubs from the MNL-1 disrupted the previous season. More disruption came when Nay Pyi Taw and City Yangon withdrew from the competition towards the end of the 2017 season. At an emergency meeting of the MNL committee on September 12, Nay Pyi Taw was expelled from the league after its players complained of not having been paid since April. The expulsion came after players boycotted a game in early September. An unsuccessful coup attempt in Turkey in July last year created a crisis for City Yangon that forced its departure from the MNL. It was a big disappointment for the club, which won the 2017 MNL-2 championship to end the season undefeated. MNL-2 third-place winners Myawady FC were promoted along with runners-up Sagaing United to the 2018 Myanmar National League.

In the lead up to the 2018 season, the MNL inked a three-year sponsorship deal with the country's biggest TelCo MPT that will support funds for the Myanmar National League, MNL-2 and the youth competitions up until the 2020 season.

2018 Title Sponsor

Myanma Posts and Telecommunications signed 3 years contract with MNL. They help to develop Myanmar Football and Youth program.

Name Changes
Mahar United changed its name to Sagaing United.

Teams
A total of 12 teams are competing in the 2018 season: 10 sides from the 2017 season and two promoted teams from the 2017 Myanmar National League 2.

Stadiums

(*) – not ready to play. MNL clubs that have not had their home stadia ready to host home matches currently use Aung San Stadium and Thuwunna Stadium in Yangon.

Managerial changes

Foreign players
The number of foreign players is restricted to four per MNL club. A team can use three foreign players on the field in each game, including a slot for a player from among AFC countries.

The number of foreign players is restricted to five per T1 team. A team can use four foreign players on the field in each game, including at least one player from the AFC member countries (3+1).
Note :: players who released during summer transfer window;: players who registered during summer transfer window.↔: players who have dual nationality by half-caste or naturalization.→: players who left club after registered during second leg.

Personnel and sponsoring
Note: Flags indicate national team as has been defined under FIFA eligibility rules. Players may hold more than one non-FIFA nationality.

Result

League table

Positions by round

Results by match played

Matches
Fixtures and results of the Myanmar National League 2018 season.

Week 1

Week 2

Week 3

Week 4

Week 5

Week 6

Week 7

Week 8

Week 9

Week 10

Week 11

Week 12

Week 13

Week 14

Week 15

Week 16

Week 17

Week 18

Week 19

Week 20

Week 21

Week 22

Season statistics

Top scorers
As of 23 September 2018.

Hat-tricks

Clean sheets
As of 23 September 2018.

Awards

Monthly awards

See also
2018 National League 2
2017-18 Myanmar Women's League

References

External links
 Myanmar National League Official Website
 Myanmar National League Facebook Official Page

Myanmar National League seasons
Myanmar
2018 in Burmese football